The Mont Mégantic Observatory (OMM) is an astronomical observatory owned and operated jointly by the Université de Montréal (UdeM), and the Université Laval (ULaval). Founded in 1978, the observatory houses the second largest telescope in Eastern Canada after David Dunlap Observatory near Toronto. It is situated at the summit of Mont Mégantic, the highest point of Eastern Canada accessible by car.

The asteroid 4843 Mégantic is named for the observatory.

Telescope

The  Ritchey-Chrétien telescope is equipped with a complement of modern instruments.  Imaging, spectroscopy, and polarimetry are routinely conducted at both visible and infrared wavelengths.

Light pollution

Efforts to control local light pollution, about one-quarter of which is due to the nearby city of Sherbrooke, have led to the establishment of the world's first International Dark-Sky Association (IDA) Dark Sky preserve around the observatory, covering some 5500 square km (2123 square miles).

ASTROLab
ASTROLab is an astronomy activity centre operate by the Parc national du Mont-Mégantic. There are interactive displays about the history of the Universe, the Earth and life. Visitor can take guided daytime tours of ASTROLab and the Mount Megantic Observatory. There are also astronomy evenings, an astronomy festival, and the Perseid Festival.

Solar eclipse of April 8th 2024
The observatory is near the center path of totality of the solar eclipse of April 8, 2024.

See also
List of astronomical observatories
List of largest optical reflecting telescopes

References

External links
 Homepage of the Observatoire du Mont-Mégantic
 Mont Mégantic Observatory Clear Sky Clock Forecasts of observing conditions.
 Astrolab du parc national du Mont-Mégantic Information about visiting the ASTROlab during the day.
 360 interactive panorama featuring Mont Mégantic Observatory

Astronomical observatories in Canada
Science museums in Canada
Museums in Estrie
Dark-sky preserves in Canada
Tourist attractions in Estrie
Buildings and structures in Estrie